Bootstrapping populations in statistics and mathematics starts with a sample  observed from a random variable. 

When X has a given distribution law with a set of non fixed parameters, we denote with a vector , a parametric inference problem consists of computing suitable values – call them estimates – of these parameters precisely on the basis of the sample. An estimate is suitable if replacing it with the unknown parameter does not cause major damage in next computations. In Algorithmic inference, suitability of an estimate reads in terms of compatibility with the observed sample.

In this framework, resampling methods are aimed at generating a set of candidate values to replace the unknown parameters that we read as compatible replicas of them. They represent a population of specifications of a random vector    compatible with an observed sample, where the compatibility of its values has the properties of a  probability distribution. By plugging parameters into the expression of the questioned distribution law, we bootstrap entire populations of random variables compatible with the observed sample.

The rationale of the algorithms computing the replicas, which we denote population bootstrap procedures, is to identify a set of statistics  exhibiting specific properties, denoting a well behavior, w.r.t. the unknown parameters. The statistics are expressed as functions of the observed values , by definition. The  may be expressed as a function of the unknown parameters and a random seed specification  through the sampling mechanism , in turn. Then, by plugging the second expression in the former, we obtain  expressions  as functions of seeds and parameters – the master equations – that we invert to find values of the latter as a function of: i) the statistics, whose values in turn are fixed at the observed ones; and ii) the seeds, which are random according to their own distribution. Hence from a set of seed samples we obtain a set of parameter replicas.

Method 

Focusing on  well-behaved statistics,

{| 
|-
| 
|-
|   
|-
|  
|}

for their parameters, the master equations read

{| width=100%
|-
| 
|-
| width=90% |   
| width=10% align="center" | (1)  
|-
| 
|}

For each sample seed  a vector of parameters  is obtained from the solution of the above system with  fixed to the observed values.
 
{| width=100%
|- 
| width=90% | 
| width=10% align="center" | (2)
|}

Some indeterminacies remain if X is discrete and this we will be considered shortly.
The whole procedure may be summed up in the form of the following Algorithm, where the index  of  denotes the parameter vector from which the statistics vector is derived.

Algorithm 

 You may easily see from a table of sufficient statistics that we obtain the curve in the picture on the left by computing the empirical distribution (2) on the population obtained through the above algorithm when: i) X is an Exponential random variable, ii) , and 
, 
.

Remark
Note that the accuracy with which a parameter distribution law of
populations compatible with a sample is obtained is not a function of the sample size. Instead, it is a function of the number of seeds we draw. In turn, this number is purely a matter of computational time but does not require any extension of the observed data. With other bootstrapping methods focusing on a generation of sample replicas (like those proposed by ) the accuracy of the estimate distributions depends on the sample size.

Example
For  expected to represent a Pareto distribution, whose specification requires values for the parameters  and k, we have that the cumulative distribution function reads: 

.

A sampling mechanism  has  uniform seed U and explaining function  described by:

 
The master equations read

Notes

References 

Computational statistics
Algorithmic inference
Resampling (statistics)